Rutland was a parliamentary constituency covering the county of Rutland.  It was represented in the House of Commons of the Parliament of the United Kingdom until 1918, when it became part of the Rutland and Stamford constituency, along with Stamford in Lincolnshire.  Since 1983, Rutland has formed part of the Rutland and Melton constituency along with Melton Mowbray from Leicestershire.

The constituency elected two Members of Parliament (MPs), traditionally known as Knights of the Shire, until 1885, when it was reduced to one Member.

Boundaries 
The constituency comprised the whole of the historic county of Rutland, in the East Midlands. Rutland, the smallest of the historic counties of England, never had any Parliamentary borough constituencies within its borders.

The place of election for the county was at Oakham. This was where the hustings were held; at which candidates were nominated (before the Ballot Act 1872), polling took place (before the introduction of multiple polling places in county constituencies) and where the result was announced.

Pelling in his Social Geography of British Elections 1885–1910 describes most of the people in this county as "engaged in or dependent upon agriculture". The constituency was a safe Conservative one and was rarely contested in the period covered by the book. G. H. Finch MP had personally owned almost one tenth of the county he represented.

Members of Parliament

1295–1640

1640–1885

1885–1918

Elections
Population in 1831: 19,380

General Election 1832 (December 14)
Registered Electors: 1,296
G N Noel, Bart. Conservative
G Heathcote Whig

General Election 1835 (January 10)
G N Noel, Bart. Conservative
G Heathcote Whig

General Election 1837 (July 29)
G N Noel, Bart. Conservative
G Heathcote Whig

Following the death of Sir G N Noel:

By-Election 1838 (March 13)
W M Noel Conservative

Elections in the 1830s

Noel's death caused a by-election.

Elections in the 1840s
Noel resigned by accepting the office of Steward of the Chiltern Hundreds, causing a by-election.

Dawnay resigned by accepting the office of Steward of the Chiltern Hundreds, causing a by-election.

Elections in the 1850s

Heathcote was elevated to the peerage, becoming 1st Baron Aveland and causing a by-election.

Elections in the 1860s

Noel was appointed a Lord Commissioner of the Treasury, requiring a by-election.

Heathcote succeeded to the peerage, becoming Lord Aveland and causing a by-election.

Elections in the 1870s 

Noel was appointed First Commissioner of Works and Public Buildings.

Elections in the 1880s 

Noel's resignation caused a by-election, which was the first contest in the constituency for 42 years.

Elections in the 1890s

Elections in the 1900s

Elections in the 1910s 

General Election 1914–15:

Another General Election was required to take place before the end of 1915. The political parties had been making preparations for an election to take place and by July 1914, the following candidates had been selected; 
Unionist: John Gretton
Liberal:

References

 Robert Beatson, A Chronological Register of Both Houses of Parliament (London: Longman, Hurst, Res & Orme, 1807) 
 D Brunton & D H Pennington, Members of the Long Parliament (London: George Allen & Unwin, 1954)
 Cobbett's Parliamentary history of England, from the Norman Conquest in 1066 to the year 1803 (London: Thomas Hansard, 1808) Digital Bodleian
 F W S Craig, Boundaries of Parliamentary Constituencies 1885–1972 (Parliamentary Reference Publications 1972)
 F W S Craig, British Parliamentary Election Results 1832–1885 (2nd edition, Aldershot: Parliamentary Research Services, 1989)
 M Kinnear, The British Voter (London: Batsford, 1968)
 McCalmont's Parliamentary Poll Book of All Elections 1832–1918
 Lewis Namier & John Brooke, The History of Parliament: The House of Commons 1754–1790 (London: HMSO, 1964)
 J E Neale, The Elizabethan House of Commons (London: Jonathan Cape, 1949)
 Henry Pelling, Social Geography of British Elections 1885–1910 (Macmillan, 1967)
 Henry Stooks Smith, The Parliaments of England (1st edition published in three volumes 1844–50), second edition edited (in one volume) by F.W.S. Craig (Political Reference Publications 1973)

Parliamentary constituencies in Rutland (historic)
Constituencies of the Parliament of the United Kingdom established in 1290
Constituencies of the Parliament of the United Kingdom disestablished in 1918
Rutland